Vital Makawchyk (born 20 September 1981) is a retired Belarusian professional footballer.

Makawchyk's son Artem is also a professional football goalkeeper.

External links

1981 births
Living people
Belarusian footballers
Association football goalkeepers
Belarusian expatriate footballers
Expatriate footballers in Ukraine
FC Shakhtyor Soligorsk players
FC SKVICH Minsk players
FC DSK Gomel players
FC Metalurh Zaporizhzhia players
FC Krumkachy Minsk players